The Open Internacional de Valencia is a tournament for professional female tennis players played on outdoor clay courts. The event is part of the WTA 125 tournament series and has been held in Valencia, Spain since 2021. 

In 2022, the tournament was upgraded to WTA 125 level, after being previously held on the ITF Women's World Tennis Tour.

Past finals

Singles

Doubles

External links
 
 ITF search

WTA 125 tournaments
ITF Women's World Tennis Tour
Recurring sporting events established in 2021
Clay court tennis tournaments
Tennis tournaments in Spain